Xi Shi is a 2009 Chinese-language western-style opera by woman composer Lei Lei to a libretto by Zou Jingzhi. The plot is based on the story of Xi Shi. The premiere was at Beijing's NCPA.

References

Chinese western-style operas
Operas
2009 operas
Operas by Lei Lei
Works by Zou Jingzhi